Thomas Dietz (born May 19, 1982) is a professional juggler from Regensburg, Germany. He is recognized as one of the greatest technical jugglers in the world.  He holds various unofficial juggling records and also the five club juggling world record of 53 minutes and 21 seconds. However, he gained most of his popularity through several juggling videos featuring his highly technical tricks including siteswap variations, pirouettes, and long runs of numbers with clubs, balls, and sometimes rings.

Titles

2004
International Jugglers' Association 57th Summer Festival
 Individual Stage Competition - Gold
 Solo Numbers Ball Competition - 1st - 8 balls, 23 catches
 Solo Numbers Club Competition - 3rd - 6 clubs, 25 catches
 Solo Numbers Ring Competition - 3rd - 8 rings, 17 catches

World Juggling Federation WJF1
 Advanced Balls Competition - 2nd - score of 9.04
 Advanced Clubs Competition - 3rd - score of 8.14
 Advanced Rings Competition - 2nd - score of 8.86
 Endurance Balls Competition - 1st - 9 balls, 25 catches
 Endurance Rings Competition - 2nd - 8 Rings, 19 Catches

2005
World Juggling Federation WJF2
 Advanced Balls Competition - 1st - score of 12.5
 Advanced Clubs Competition - 2nd - score of 11.1
 Advanced Rings Competition - 1st - score of 8.0
 Endurance Balls Competition - 1st - 9 balls, 18 catches
 Endurance Clubs Competition - 3rd - 6 clubs, 132 catches
 Endurance Rings Competition - 1st - 8 rings, 16 catches

2006
World Juggling Federation WJF3
 Overall Competition - 1st - score of 35.00
 Advanced Balls Competition - 1st - score of 9.33
 Advanced Rings Competition - 2nd - score of 8.71
 Advanced Clubs Competition - 1st - score of 8.71
 Endurance Balls Competition - 1st - 9 balls, 27 catches
 Endurance Rings Competition - 2nd - 8 Rings, 15 Catches
 Endurance Clubs Competition - 2nd - 7 Clubs, 28 Catches

2007
World Juggling Federation WJF4
 Overall Championship - 1st - score of 39.65
 Advanced Balls Competition - 1st - score of 9.6
 Advanced Rings Competition - 1st - score of 9.4
 Advanced Clubs Competition - 2nd - score of 7.9
 5 Ball Freestyle - 2nd
 6 Ball Freestyle - 1st, with a B97531 into a 4 up multiplex into a high low shower
 7 Ball Freestyle - 1st, with DB97531
 5 Rings Freestyle - 2nd, with a 6x4 5 up 720
 6 Rings Freestyle - 1st, with a 6 up synch 360 into a 6 up synch 360
 7 Rings Freestyle - 1st, with a 5 up 360
 3 Clubs Freestyle - 4th
 4 Clubs Freestyle - 4th
 5 Clubs Freestyle - 3rd, with a 3 up 720 into one sided flat throws
 3 Clubs 360s - 2nd, with 34
 5 Clubs 360s - 2nd, with 11
 5 Balls 360s - 1st, with 27
 5 Rings 360s - 1st, with 19
 7 Balls Isolated Endurance - 1st
 7 Rings Isolated Endurance - 1st

2008
World Juggling Federation WJF5
 Overall Championship - 1st
 Advanced Balls Competition - 1st - score of 15.5
 Advanced Rings Competition - 2nd - score of 9.4
 Advanced Clubs Competition - 2nd - score of 7.8
 6 Ball Freestyle - 1st, with a high low 4 up 720
 7 Ball Freestyle - 4th
 5 Rings Freestyle - 1st, with an over and back with 4 up each way
 6 Rings Freestyle - 1st, with a (8,8)(4,4)>6 up 360>4 up 360> qualify
 7 Rings Freestyle - 1st, with a 5 up 360 into (8x, 6)
 5 Clubs Freestyle - 1st, with a 3 up 720 into one sided flats
 6 Clubs Freestyle - 3rd, with a 9555 into 75
 Battle for the World Juggling Federation (WJF) presidency -1st 10.9

Videos
Mark Probst, a friend of Thomas, released several videos of Thomas and others (including himself and Vova Galchenko) juggling by posting them to the newsgroup rec.juggling under his nickname "Schani".

 Thomas Dietz Video #1 (released Sept. 19, 2003)
Devil in Disguise by Elvis Presley
Trepak from Tchaikovsky's The Nutcracker (exact artist of the version in the video is unknown)
Thomas Dietz Video #2 (released Oct. 8, 2003)
 I've Got Two Legs by Monty Python
 Axel F by Nile Rodgers
 Smooth Criminal by Alien Ant Farm
Thomas Dietz Video #3 (released Nov. 24, 2003)
 Wannabe by Spice Girls
 Self Esteem by The Offspring
 All Shook Up by Elvis Presley
Thomas Dietz Video #4 (released December, 2003)
 BND by No Doubt
 The Twist by Chubby Checker
Juggling in Berlin (released Dec. 20, 2003)
 One Vision by Queen
Thomas Dietz Video #5 (released Dec. 22, 2003)
 Basket Case performed by Avril Lavigne (cover of Green Day)
 Also Sprach Zarathustra by Richard Strauss (theme from 2001: A Space Odyssey)
Thomas Dietz Video #6 (released Dec. 23, 2003)
 Theme from Star Wars by John Williams
 Red River Rock by Johnny and the Hurricanes
 Let Me Entertain You by Robbie Williams
The Markus Furtner and Thomas Dietz Show (released Dec. 29, 2003)
 HIStory by Michael Jackson
The Thomas Dietz Video Nobody Wants to See (released Dec. 30, 2003)
 (Let Me Be Your) Teddy Bear by Elvis Presley
 Black & White by Sarah McLachlan
Thomas Dietz Video #7 (released Feb. 11, 2004)
Thomas Dietz Video #8 (released Feb. 16, 2004)
 Sk8er Boi by Avril Lavigne
Thomas Dietz Video #9 (released Feb. 20, 2004)
 Basket Case by Green Day
 Yakety Yak by The Coasters
Competition Video (released March, 2004)
 Spokesman by Goldfinger
Thomas Dietz's Worst Tricks (released Sept. 7, 2004)
 Bohemian Polka by "Weird Al" Yankovic
 All The Small Things by blink-182
 My Happy Ending by Avril Lavigne
Juggling in Israel (released Nov. 25, 2004)
 Taluy al Hazlav (Hung on the Cross) by Rami Fortis (song is in Hebrew)
Another Thomas Dietz Video Nobody Wants to See (Nov. 26, 2004)
 Popcorn by Hot Butter
 Walk Like an Egyptian by The Bangles
Still Juggling in Berlin (released Nov. 28, 2004)
 Eye of the Tiger by Survivor
Still Not Thomas Dietz Video #10 (released Dec. 17, 2004)
 Think by Aretha Franklin
 Burning Love by Elvis Presley
Thomas Dietz Video #10 (released Dec. 20, 2004)
 (theme from Star Trek)
 Anthem Part 2 by Blink-182
 Smooth Criminal by Alien Ant Farm
Manuel Mitasch and Thomas Dietz (released Jan. 11, 2005)
 Don't Pick it Up by The Offspring
 All I Want by The Offspring
Juggling in Linz (released May 2, 2005)
 Diamond by Klint from the Snatch motion picture soundtrack.
 Beware Of Us by Xzibit (feat. Strong Arm Steady)

Produced by Thomas
In December 2006, Thomas began releasing short videos on YouTube.

Clip 1 (released Dec. 19, 2006)
 Spring from The Four Seasons by Antonio Vivaldi
 Infernal Galop from Act II, Scene 2 in Orpheus in the Underworld  by Jacques Offenbach
Clip 2 (released Dec. 25, 2006)
 Humppasonni by Eläkeläiset
Thomas Dietz Video #11 Trailer (released Dec. 26, 2006)
 Anthem Part 2 by Blink-182

See also
List of jugglers

References

Further reading

External links
Thomas Dietz's commercial website
Dietz's personal and unofficial records on IJDb
Dietz's YouTube channel
Dietz videos hosted on YouTube - a chronological playlist

1982 births
Living people
Jugglers
Sportspeople from Regensburg